Diego Fernando Pérez Aguado (born 18 May 1980), nicknamed "Ruso" (Spanish for "Russian"), is a Uruguayan former professional footballer who played as a defensive midfielder. He has played 89 matches for the Uruguay national football team, including the 2010 FIFA World Cup and the 2001, 2004, 2007 and 2011 editions of the Copa América.

Club career
Pérez was born in Montevideo. At the age of 19, Pérez joined one of the clubs of his hometown, Defensor Sporting, soon becoming a first-team regular. He joined a larger club from Montevideo, C.A. Peñarol, in 2003 but only played 13 games with them before being shipped off to France to play for Didier Deschamps' AS Monaco. During his time at Monaco he had to battle for his place in the defensive midfield spot against Lucas Bernardi, Akis Zikos and Gerard López and was especially favored by the manager Francesco Guidolin during the Italian's reign in the 2005–06 season.

Bologna
On 31 August 2010, he was signed by Italian Serie A team Bologna for €2.1 million (including 5% solidarity contribution to youth clubs). No fee was scheduled to pay on that day, but 2 equal installments was scheduled on 31 December 2010 and 30 June 2011.  At Bologna, he has teamed up with fellow Uruguayan internationals, Henry Damián Giménez, Gastón Ramírez and Miguel Britos, before this left the squad to join S.S.C. Napoli. In Pérez first season in the Serie A, Bologna managed 16th place and finished six points clear of relegation, confirming a fourth successive season in the Italian top flight. He also managed three assists during the campaign, tied for most on the team along with Riccardo Meggiorini.

After being without a club for  months, Pérez signed a new two-year contract with Bologna in August 2013. He retired at the end of the 2014–2015 season.

International career
Pérez was capped for Uruguay in four successive editions of the Copa América, helping his country lift their 15th South American championship in 2011. He was also selected to 2010 FIFA World Cup. On 16 July 2011, he scored his first goal for the national team in a match against hosts Argentina in the Copa America quarterfinals, although he was also sent off in the same match. Pérez was back for the final match against Paraguay, starting in defensive midfield in a 3–0 win.

Personal life
His older brother Omar Pérez is also a professional footballer, who played for Cerro as a midfielder.

Career statistics

International
Source:

International goals

Honours

International
Uruguay
Copa América Winner: 2011; Third Place: 2004; Fourth Place: 2001, 2007
FIFA World Cup Fourth Place: 2010

References

External links
Diego Perez atYahoo! sports

Unofficial Diego Perez fan site

1980 births
Living people
Footballers from Montevideo
Association football midfielders
Uruguayan footballers
Uruguay under-20 international footballers
Uruguay international footballers
Uruguayan expatriate footballers
Defensor Sporting players
Peñarol players
AS Monaco FC players
Bologna F.C. 1909 players
2001 Copa América players
2004 Copa América players
2007 Copa América players
2010 FIFA World Cup players
2011 Copa América players
Uruguayan Primera División players
Ligue 1 players
Serie A players
Serie B players
Expatriate footballers in France
Expatriate footballers in Monaco
Expatriate footballers in Italy
Uruguayan expatriate sportspeople in Monaco
Uruguayan expatriate sportspeople in Italy
2013 FIFA Confederations Cup players
2014 FIFA World Cup players
Copa América-winning players